Cho La may refer to:

 Cho La (Sikkim, India and Tibet, China), a mountain pass between Sikkim, India and Tibet, China
 Cho La (Nepal), a mountain pass in Nepal
 Cho La (Sichuan, China), a mountain pass in Sichuan, China
 Chola Mountains, a mountain range in western Sichuan, China, named after the pass

See also
 Chola (disambiguation)